In coordination chemistry, denticity refers to the number of donor groups in a given ligand that bind to the central metal atom in a coordination complex.  In many cases, only one atom in the ligand binds to the metal, so the denticity equals one, and the ligand is said to be monodentate (sometimes called unidentate). Ligands with more than one bonded atom are called polydentate or multidentate. The denticity of a ligand is described with the Greek letter κ ('kappa').  For example, κ6-EDTA describes an EDTA ligand that coordinates through 6 non-contiguous atoms.

Denticity is different from hapticity because hapticity refers exclusively to ligands where the coordinating atoms are contiguous.  In these cases the η ('eta') notation is used.  Bridging ligands use the μ ('mu') notation.

Classes 

Polydentate ligands are chelating agents and classified by their denticity. Some atoms cannot form the maximum possible number of bonds a ligand could make. In that case one or more binding sites of the ligand are unused. Such sites can be used to form a bond with another chemical species.
 Bidentate (also called didentate) ligands bind with two atoms, an example being ethylenediamine.

 Tridentate ligands bind with three atoms, an example being terpyridine.  Tridentate ligands usually bind via two kinds of connectivity, called "mer" and "fac." "fac" stands for facial, the donor atoms are arranged on a triangle around one face of the octahedron. "mer" stands for meridian, where the donor atoms are stretched out around one half of the octahedron.  Cyclic tridentate ligands such as TACN and 9-ane-S3 bind in a facial manner.
 Tetradentate ligands bind with four donor atoms, an example being triethylenetetramine (abbreviated trien).  For different central metal geometries there can be different numbers of isomers depending on the ligand's topology and the geometry of the metal center. For octahedral metals, the linear tetradentate trien can bind via three geometries. Tripodal tetradentate ligands, e.g. tris(2-aminoethyl)amine, are more constrained, and on octahedra leave two cis sites (adjacent to each other).  Many naturally occurring macrocyclic ligands are tetradentative, an example being the porphyrin in heme. On an octahedral metal these leave two vacant sites opposite each other.
 Pentadentate ligands bind with five atoms, an example being ethylenediaminetriacetic acid.
 Hexadentate ligands bind with six atoms, an example being EDTA (although it can bind in a tetradentate manner).
 Ligands of denticity greater than 6 are well known.  The ligands 1,4,7,10-tetraazacyclododecane-1,4,7,10-tetraacetate (DOTA) and diethylene triamine pentaacetate (DTPA) are octadentate.  They are particularly useful for binding lanthanide ions, which typically have coordination numbers greater than 6.

Stability constants
In general, the stability of a metal complex correlates with the denticity of the ligands, which can be attributed to the chelate effect. Polydentate ligands such as hexa- or octadentate ligands tend to bind metal ions more strongly than ligands of lower denticity, primarily due to entropic factors. Stability constants are a quantitative measure to assess the thermodynamic stability of coordination complexes.

See also
 Chelate

External links
EDTA chelation lecture notes.  2.4MB PDF - Slide 3 on denticity

References

Coordination chemistry
Chemical bonding
Chelating agents